The MRT Jakarta 1000 series Ratangga, known legally as the Series K1 1 18, are the first rolling stocks to operate in the MRT Jakarta system. Built by Nippon Sharyo under Contract CP108, all sets were built in 2018 and started operation on 24 March 2019.

History 
Contract CP 108 for the procurement of rolling stock for the Jakarta MRT was awarded to a consortium led by Sumitomo Corporation, on 3 March 2015. 16 six-car trainsets were ordered at a cost of ¥10.8 billion (Rp. 145 billion). The trains were built in Nippon Sharyo's Toyokawa, Aichi plant.

Specifications 
These trains use the CBTC signaling system and are equipped with automatic train operation (ATO) under GoA 2, with drivers operating the doors and driving in case of emergency. Like the KRL Commuterline, the MRT trains are also powered via overhead catenary.

Naming and service 
On 10 January 2018, the Governor of Jakarta, Anies Baswedan gave the first batch of MRT Jakarta trainsets the name "Ratangga". The name was derived from the old Javanese word for chariots. It offers a women-only carriage during morning peak hours from 7AM to 9AM and in the afternoon from 5PM to 7PM.

Notes

References 

Electric multiple units of Indonesia
1500 V DC multiple units
Nippon Sharyo multiple units
Jakarta MRT